The 1952 United States Senate election in Maryland was held on November 4, 1952.

Incumbent Democratic Senator Herbert O'Conor chose not to seek re-election for a second term. Republican U.S. Representative James Glenn Beall defeated Democrat George P. Mahoney to win the open seat.

Democratic primary

Candidates
 Lansdale G. Sasscer, U.S. Representative from Upper Marlboro
 George P. Mahoney, paving contractor and candidate for Governor in 1950
 Stephen B. Petticord

Results

Republican primary

Candidates
 James Glenn Beall, U.S. Representative from Frostburg
 Royden Addison Blunt
 H. Grady Gore, lawyer and real estate investor
 Thomas Hankinson
 Herman L. Mills

Results

General election

Results

Results by county

Counties that flipped from Democrat to Republican
Calvert
Caroline
Howard
Kent
Montgomery
Prince George's
Wicomico
Worcester

Counties that flipped from Republican to Democrat
Somerset

See also
1952 United States Senate elections
1952 United States elections

References

Notes

1952
Maryland
United States Senate